The FIBA Women's European Championship for Small Countries is the lowest-ranked tier of the biannual FIBA EuroBasket Women competition, organized by FIBA Europe.

History
This championship was first introduced in 1989, as the Promotion Cup, the competition organized for the lowest ranked European national basketball teams. Since then, the competition has been held biannually. In 2007, the Promotion Cup was officially renamed EuroBasket Division C.

In 2011, after the divisional system for the FIBA EuroBasket was abolished, the FIBA EuroBasket Division C was renamed FIBA European Championship for Small Countries.

Results

Performance

References

External links
 2018 FIBA Women's European Championship for Small Countries at FIBA official website

 
Small Countries
1989 establishments in Europe
Recurring sporting events established in 1989